Arthur Surridge Hunt, FBA (1 March 1871 – 18 June 1934) was an English papyrologist.

Hunt was born in Romford, Essex, England. Over the course of many years, Hunt, along with Bernard Grenfell, recovered many papyri from excavation sites in Egypt, including the Oxyrhynchus Papyri.

He worked with Campbell Cowan Edgar on a translation of the Zenon Papyri from the original Greek and Demotic.

In 1913 he became Professor of Papyrology at Oxford succeeding to his lifelong friend and colleague Grenfell, whose professorship lapsed due to the latter’s breakdowns and depression.

Publications
Grenfell, Bernard Pyne and Hunt, Arthur Surridge, Sayings of Our Lord from an early Greek Papyrus (Egypt Exploration Fund; 1897).
Grenfell, Bernard Pyne, Hunt, Arthur Surridge, and Hogarth, David George, Fayûm Towns and Their Papyri (London 1900).
Grenfell, Bernard Pyne and Hunt, Arthur Surridge, eds., Hellenica Oxyrhynchia cum Theopompi et Cratippi Fragmentis (Oxford: Clarendon Press, 1909).
Hunt, Arthur Surridge, "Papyri and Papyrology." The Journal of Egyptian Archaeology 1, no. 2 (1914): 81–92.

See also
 Oxyrhynchus 2011

Sources
 Author and Book Info.com
 Catalogus Philologorum Classicorum
 Catalogus Philologorum Classicorum
 Arthur Surridge Hunt

External links

 with items provided by Arthur Hunt

Bibliography
 The Oxyrhynchus papyri, edited with translations and notes by Bernard P. Grenfell and Arthur S. Hunt, Cornell University Library Historical Monographs Collection. {Reprinted by} Cornell University Library Digital Collections

1871 births
1934 deaths
English Egyptologists
British papyrologists
People from Romford
Alumni of The Queen's College, Oxford
Oxfordshire and Buckinghamshire Light Infantry officers
Intelligence Corps officers
British Army personnel of World War I
Fellows of the British Academy